Bajo otro sol (Spanish for Under Another Sun), is a 1988 Argentine film.

Plot summary 
A lawyer named Manuel Ojeda moves back to his home town, Córdoba, Argentina. A member of the Peronist Youth goes missing because of Alberto Barrantes, who was an employee of a factory he used to work at. Manuel tries to find the missing person.

Cast
Carlos Centeno
Laura Cikra
Ulises Dumont
Jorge González
Miguel Angel Sola

Argentine drama films
1980s Spanish-language films
1988 films
1980s Argentine films

References